"Ready or Not" is a song by American hip-hop group Fugees, from their second studio album, The Score (1996). The song contains a sample of "Boadicea" (1987) by Irish singer Enya, and its chorus is based on "Ready or Not Here I Come (Can't Hide from Love)" by the Delfonics.

"Ready or Not" topped the charts in Iceland and the United Kingdom; in the latter country, "Ready or Not" became the Fugees' second chart-topping song on the UK Singles Chart, following "Killing Me Softly"; and became one of the best-selling songs of 1996 in the region. The single has been certified Platinum in the UK and in the United States. The accompanying music video was directed by film director Marcus Nispel, and was reported to have cost approximately 1.3 million dollars at the time, making it one of the most expensive music videos ever.

"Ready or Not" was placed on the Rock and Roll Hall of Fame list of the 'Songs That Shaped Rock and Roll'.

Background
The song contains a sample of "Boadicea" by New-Age singer, Enya from her first solo album, Enya (1987). Enya considered suing the Fugees because they had sampled "Boadicea" without her permission. Enya stated, "We were actually on the verge of suing them because of the copyright infringement, because they just didn't approach us. It was a case of, I wasn't featured at all on the credits and it [the sample] was very much a part of the song." However, the singer reached an agreement with the Fugees to an out-of-court settlement after she realized that their music wasn't gangsta rap. According to Wyclef, "Luckily when Enya heard everything, she was like, ‘This is different’ and she gave us a pass – which she don’t even need to do." The situation was a learning experience for the group, who at the time were unaware of copyright clearance and unfamiliar with publishing procedures.

The song's chorus is based on "Ready or Not Here I Come (Can't Hide from Love)" by the Delfonics, which was an addition suggested by Wyclef Jean. Reflecting on the recording process, Pras said: "At one point, the group had disbanded. Lauryn Hill had left the group at this point and we didn't know what we were going to do. She calls me and says, 'Listen, I'm going to come down to the studio and I'm going to lay down a reference for you guys, a hook. I give you permission to use my hook, my voice, but I don't want to be a part of this group anymore.' I said, 'Fair enough. No problem.' She said, 'Make sure certain people are not around when I'm there.' I said, 'No problem.' She's laying the reference for 'Ready or Not' and then she goes into the bridge and she's crying. I see her crying. She stops and says, 'I can't do this anymore,' and leaves. A couple months later she re-joins the group. She said, 'Let's do 'Ready or Not' again 'cause I was crying. It was emotional.' She goes in the studio to do 'Ready or Not' again. She was in there five hours doing the hook. Every hit is incredible. But we go back and say, 'There's something about that reference. I don't know if we can touch that.' We end up keeping the reference. That's what the world has come to hear. There's something about that record… That's magic."

Critical reception
Larry Flick from Billboard felt the song was "far more representative of the act's vibe", and that "this cut nicely illustrates its lyrical strength as well as its talent for switching from smooth soul singing to sharp rapping within the space of a few seconds." Gil L. Robertson IV from Cash Box named it a "standout track" of The Score album. Damien Mendis from Music Weeks RM Dance Update rated it five out of five, commenting, "New Jersey's pride and joy retum with a soulful blend of rap, R&B and reggae. The original Radio version taken from their gold-selling album [...] already won fans due to its hypnotic use of The Delfonics' number 41 hit of 1971 'Ready Or Not, Here I Come (Can't Hide From Love)'. The promos even adopt the original Bell label logo colour and style." David Fricke from Rolling Stone remarked "the sweet heat of Lauryn Hill's alto". A reviewer from Spin magazine described the song as "an eerily ambient flow of confused musings (Jean), confident harmonies (Hill), and immigrant pride (Michel), tapped insistently into your consciousness by a simple snare beat."

Music video
The accompanying music video for "Ready or Not" was directed by Marcus Nispel. Vibe reported that the video helped usher in the era of bank-breaking, movie-like hip-hop videos. The video featured helicopters, explosions, sharks, chase scenes, and a price tag of 1.3 million US dollars. In justifying the cost, Pras told Vibe "People want to see drama, man. You figure: A kid pays sixteen dollars for your CD. Let him see a good video."

Cover versions and usage in media
The song was covered by British-Dutch house music artist The Course. It charted at number five on the UK Singles Chart in April 1997. In 2012, The Fray did a cover of this song on their album Scars & Stories. Natti Natasha's single "No Quiero Saber" was inspired by "Ready or Not". "I Don't Wanna Know" by American R&B artist Mario Winans and Diddy, is based on a sample of the song. It has additionally been sampled by Fredo and Summer Walker on their song "Ready", by Meek Mill on his song of the same name, Bridgit Mendler on her song of the same name, Bastille on "Forever Ever", and Busta Rhymes and Chance the Rapper on the song "Hello". Further, "Helpless" from the musical Hamilton, references the track.

In 2016, a video of the rapper Drake reciting the lyrics to the song at the age of 8, went viral on the internet; the song would later be covered by Sunday Service Choir, during Drake's benefit concert alongside Kanye West to advocate for the prison release of Larry Hoover. Actress Gina Rodriguez received backlash after reciting a lyric in the song that used the N-word in a video, she later issued a public apology. In 2018, the clothing brand Afield Out released a capsule collection that paid homage to "Ready or Not". During Barack Obama's 2008 presidential campaign, Blender magazine published a list of his top ten favorite songs, and "Ready or Not" topped the list.

The NBA TV documentary of the same name (2021), was titled and themed after the song. A remixed version of the song featuring the main vocal is played at the Tottenham Hotspur Stadium during the audio-visual build up ahead of Tottenham Hotspur's home games. American mixed martial artist Sean Soriano, used it for his walkout song during UFC Fight Night 198. The song was used in the first theatrical trailer of the 2015 film Mission: Impossible – Rogue Nation.

Track listings
 UK CD1 "Ready or Not" (radio version) – 3:47
 "Ready or Not" (Salaam's Ready for the Show Remix) – 4:24
 "Ready or Not" (Handel's Yaard Vibe Mix) – 4:41
 "The Score" – 4:32

 UK CD2'
 "Ready or Not" (album version) – 3:50
 "How Many Mics" – 4:23
 "Freestyle" – 5:03
 "Blame It on the Sun" – 5:41

Charts

Weekly charts

Year-end charts

Certifications

References

1996 singles
1996 songs
Fugees songs
Music videos directed by Marcus Nispel
Number-one singles in Iceland
Number-one singles in Israel
Song recordings produced by Jerry Duplessis
Song recordings produced by Lauryn Hill
Song recordings produced by Wyclef Jean
Songs with lyrics by Roma Ryan
Songs with music by Enya
Songs written by Lauryn Hill
Songs written by Pras
Songs written by Thom Bell
Songs written by Wyclef Jean
UK Singles Chart number-one singles